The 1954–55 Hapoel Balfouria season was the club's 13th season since its establishment, in 1906, and 7th since the establishment of the State of Israel. This was the club's second and last season in the top division.

During the season, the club competed in Liga Alef (top division) and the State Cup.

Review and events
 Before the beginning of the season, the club merged with Hapoel Afula. The club kept the name Hapoel Balfouria, although it was also called Hapoel Balfouria/Afula.
 As the club finished bottom at the end of the previous season, the club was initially placed in Liga Bet, and started the season in this division on 8 January 1955. However, as the IFA reprieved the club from relegation as part of the settlement reached to eliminate the dispute that interrupted IFA activities, the club was returned to Liga Alef, and began the season anew in Liga Alef on 5 February 1955.

Match Results

Legend

Liga Alef
 
League matches began on 6 February 1955, and by the time the season, only 20 rounds of matches were completed, delaying the end of the league season to the next season.

League table (as of 2 July 1955)

Source:

Matches

Liga Bet

Liga Alef

Results by match

State Cup

References

Hapoel Balfouria F.C. seasons
Hapoel Balfouria